The All New Adventures of Laurel & Hardy in 'For Love or Mummy'  is a 1999 comedy film directed by John R. Cherry III and Larry Harmon based on the film shorts of Laurel & Hardy. It stars Bronson Pinchot and Gailard Sartain re-creating the eponymous characters played by Stan Laurel and Oliver Hardy.

This was the first of only two non-Ernest P. Worrell films that Cherry, primarily an advertising executive, has ever directed, the other being Pirates of the Plain. Harmon earned writing and directing credits through the ownership of the Laurel and Hardy trademarks, which he had purchased in the 1960s. Another Harmon-owned character, Bozo the Clown, is mentioned in the film.

Premise
Laurel and Hardy are in Florida where they meet archeologist Henry Covington, whose daughter they try to protect from the wrath of a mummy.

Cast
 Bronson Pinchot as Stan
 Gailard Sartain as Ollie
 F. Murray Abraham as Professor Henry Covington
 Jonathan Pienaar as Young Henry
 Philip Godawa as Farouk Bin Abdullah
 Susan Danford as Leslie Covington
 Shannon Bowie as Young Leslie
 Jeffrey Pillars as Barney the biker
 Rick Rogers as Lt. Kowalski
 Farouk Valley-Omar as Habib
 Larry Harmon as the Owner of Bozoworld
 Christine Weir as Ms. Burkum
 Zane Meas as the High priest
 Gordon van Rooyen as Party man
 Matthew Haldenby as Mummy
 Lara Bye as Laura Covington
 Josh Cherry as Officer Levin
 Jeff Shapiro as Desk cop
 Peter Spiropoulos as Maitre d'
 Anton Stoltz as Chef Marino
 Timo Chaplin as Kid on skateboard
 Ryan Stuart as Pistol cop

References

External links

1999 films
1990s English-language films
1990s buddy comedy films
American buddy comedy films
American screwball comedy films
Cultural depictions of Laurel & Hardy
Films set in Egypt
Mummy films
Films directed by John R. Cherry III
1990s screwball comedy films
1999 comedy films
1990s American films